Book of Love may refer to:

Books 
 Inbam (Kural book), one of the books of the Tirukkural
 The Book of Love, a 1934 novel by Upton Sinclair
 Book of Love (originally titled Jack in the Box), a 1980 novel by William Kotzwinkle
 The Book of Love, a novel by Kathleen McGowan

Music 
 "The Book of Love" (The Monotones song), 1958
 "Book of Love", a song by Fleetwood Mac from the 1982 album Mirage
 Book of Love (band), an American synth-pop band
 Book of Love (album), the band's 1987 album, and the title track
 The Book of Love (album), by Air Supply, 1997
 "The Book of Love" (The Magnetic Fields song), 1999, covered by Peter Gabriel
 "Book of Love", a song by Toya featuring Loon from the 2001 self-titled album, Toya
 "Book of Love", a 2015 song by Felix Jaehn

Film 
 Book of Love (1990 film), directed by Robert Shaye based on William Kotzwinkle's book
 Book of Love (2002 film), directed by Jeffrey W. Byrd
 Book of Love (2004 film), directed by Alan Brown
 Book of Love (2022 film), British romance film directed by Analeine Cal y Mayor
 American Pie Presents: The Book of Love, 2009 film
 Finding Mr. Right 2 (also known as Book of Love), a 2016 Chinese-Hong Kong film directed by Xue Xiaolu
 The Book of Love (film), a 2017 American film directed by Bill Purple